The National Skill Development Agency  (NSDA) attempts to increase Employability of Youth in India. It is a fully autonomous body, constituted on the approval of Union Cabinet of India. On May 9, 2013, the Union Cabinet gave its nod to form NSDA.

History

The Union Cabinet of India held a meeting on January 31, 2013 in which the proposal for building the National Skill Development Agency (NSDA) was first endorsed, after the suggested plan was reviewed by a Group of Ministers. The United Progressive Alliance (UPA) government approved the proposal.

NSQF framework

National Skills Qualification Framework, is an integrated education and competency-based skills quality assurance framework developed by NSDA, according to which graded levels of skills are recognised based on the learning outcomes acquired through both formal or informal means. This enables students, to have their informally acquired skills graded and use those towards formal education, which is a core concept of India's National Education Policy 2020. Shri Vishwakarma Skill University in Haryana was founded on this concept.

NSQF caters for diversity of the Indian education and training systems, development of a set of outcome-based nationally recognised qualifications for each level, provide progression pathways for further study, enable integrated learning through education and vocational training and work experience, foster lifelong learning through transparent, accountable and credible mechanism which recognises prior learning.

See also 
 Education in India
 Vocational education in India
 Ministry of Skill Development and Entrepreneurship
 National Policy on Education
 National qualifications framework
 Rashtriya Uchchatar Shiksha Abhiyan
 Skill India
 University Grants Commission (India)

References

External links
 National Skill Development Agency, Official website

Vocational education in India
Government agencies of India
Educational organisations based in India
Organisations based in Delhi
Government agencies established in 2013
Ministry of Skill Development and Entrepreneurship